Takaraji-ike Dam is an earthfill dam located in Aichi Prefecture in Japan. The dam is used for irrigation. The catchment area of the dam is 1.1 km2. The dam impounds about 4  ha of land when full and can store 290 thousand cubic meters of water.

References

Dams in Aichi Prefecture
1955 establishments in Japan